The 2003 Castle Point Borough Council election took place on 1 May 2003 to elect members of Castle Point Borough Council in Essex, England. The whole council was up for election after boundary changes increased the number of seats by 2. The Conservative party gained overall control of the council from the Labour party.

Election result
The Conservatives took control of the council after gaining 22 seats to have 39 of the 41 councillors. Meanwhile, Labour was reduced to only 2 councillors after losing 19 seats. Overall turnout at the election was 26.8%, down from 32% at the 1999 election.

Among the Labour councillors to be defeated were the leader of the council Dave Wells and the mayor Charles Smith.

Ward results

References

Castle Point Borough Council elections
2003 English local elections
2000s in Essex